Baranduz Rural District is in the Central District of Urmia County, West Azerbaijan province, Iran. At the National Census of 2006, its population was 11,502 in 2,628 households. There were 11,088 inhabitants in 2,963 households at the following census of 2011. At the most recent census of 2016, the population of the rural district was 12,008 in 3,292 households. The largest of its 30 villages was Band, with 4,769 people.

References 

Urmia County

Rural Districts of West Azerbaijan Province

Populated places in West Azerbaijan Province

Populated places in Urmia County